Good Heart Specialist Hospital (also known as Good Heart Hospital or abbreviated GHSH) is a private healthcare facility in Rivers State, Nigeria. The hospital's owner is said to be  a consultant cardiologist at the University of Port Harcourt Teaching Hospital.

Location
Good Heart Specialist Hospital is situated on Evo Road, in the phase 2 of New GRA, about 1.3 km (0.8 mi) from D-line, Port Harcourt. The coordinates of the road on which the hospital building is sited are: 4°49'10.8"N, 7°0'3.5"E  (Latitude:4.819675; Longitude:7.000985).

In the news
The hospital was temporarily closed in August 2014 as were several medical centers where such cases were reported, after it was alleged that one of its patients, a doctor named Ikechukwu Enemuo, had died from Ebola. Reports revealed that Enemuo had contracted the virus while attending to an Ebola-infected ECOWAS staff who flew into Port Harcourt from Lagos for treatment in an unnamed hotel. The diplomat, however, recovered after being treated. Unfortunately, Mr. Ikechukwu Enemuo died after contact with the infected diplomat. He was rushed to GoodHeart Specialist Hospital where the medical director promptly alerted government agencies of the situation. He later died of the disease.

See also

List of hospitals in Port Harcourt

References

Private hospitals in Port Harcourt
Health facilities that treated Ebola patients